This article lists the winners and nominees for the NAACP Image Award for Outstanding Literary Work – Fiction. Walter Mosley holds the record for most wins in this category, with three.

Winners and nominees
Winners are listed first and highlighted in bold.

1990s

2000s

2010s

2020s

Multiple wins and nominations

Wins

 3 wins
 Walter Mosley

 2 wins
 Terry McMillan

Nominations

 5 nominations
 ReShonda Tate Billingsley

 4 nominations
 Walter Mosley

 3 nominations
 Eric Jerome Dickey
 Terry McMillan

 2 nominations
 Pearl Cleage
 Nikki Giovanni
 Bernice L. McFadden
 Victoria Christopher Murray
 Kimberla Lawson Roby
 Omar Tyree

References

NAACP Image Awards
American literary awards